The Shire of Donald was a local government area about  west-northwest of Bendigo, in western Victoria, Australia.

History

Donald was originally incorporated as the St Arnaud Road District on 25 June 1861, which became a shire on 22 November 1864. It was originally home to several other districts, which split away prior to 1900:

 20 October 1884 - the East Riding became the Shire of Kara Kara;
 30 January 1891 - the West Riding became the Shire of Borung, which later became the Shire of Warracknabeal;
 27 April 1894 - the North Riding became the Shire of Wycheproof;
 5 April 1895 - parts of the Central Riding became the Shire of Birchip;
 31 May 1895 - parts of the South Riding joined with parts of other shires, to become the Shire of Charlton.

On 11 February 1897, it was officially renamed to the Shire of Donald, after the largest town which remained. It annexed territory from the Shire of Dunmunkle on 26 May 1916, and from the Shire of Kara Kara on 27 April 1920.

On 20 January 1995, the Shire of Donald was abolished, and along with the Shires of Birchip, Charlton and Wycheproof, and parts of the Shire of Kara Kara, was merged into the newly created Shire of Buloke.

Wards

The Shire of Donald was divided into three wards, each of which elected three councillors:
 South Ward
 East Ward
 West Ward

Towns and localities
 Banyenong
 Buloke
 Carron
 Chirrip
 Corack
 Corack East
 Donald*
 Laen East
 Laen North
 Lake Buloke
 Litchfield
 Massey
 Mount Jeffcott
 Watchem

* Council seat.

Population

* Estimate in the 1958 Victorian Year Book.

References

External links
 Victorian Places - Donald and Donald Shire

Donald
1861 establishments in Australia